Dorothee Steffensky-Sölle (1929–2003), known as Dorothee Sölle, was a German liberation theologian who coined the term "Christofascism". She was born in Cologne and died at a conference in Göppingen from cardiac arrest.

Life and career
Sölle was born Dorothee Nipperdey on 30 September 1929 in Cologne, Germany. Her father was Professor of labour law Hans Carl Nipperdey, who would later become the first president of the West-German Federal Labour Court from 1954 to 1963. Sölle studied theology, philosophy, and literature at the University of Cologne, earning a doctorate with a thesis on the connections between theology and poetry. She taught briefly in Aachen before returning to Cologne as a university lecturer. She became active in politics, speaking out against the Vietnam War, the arms race of the Cold War, and injustices in the developing world.

Between 1975 and 1987, she spent six months a year at Union Theological Seminary in New York City, where she was a professor of systematic theology. Although she never held a professorship in Germany, she received an honorary professorship from the University of Hamburg in 1994.

She wrote a large number of books, including Theology for Skeptics: Reflections on God (1968), The Silent Cry: Mysticism and Resistance (1997), and her autobiography Against the Wind: Memoir of a Radical Christian (1999). In Beyond Mere Obedience:  Reflections on a Christian Ethic for the Future she coined the term Christofascist to describe fundamentalists. Perhaps her best-known work in English was Suffering, which offers a critique of "Christian masochism" and "Christian sadism". Sölle's critique is against the assumption that God is all-powerful and the cause of suffering; humans thus suffer for some greater purpose. Instead, God suffers and is powerless alongside us.  Humans are to struggle together against oppression, sexism, antisemitism, and other forms of authoritarianism.

Sölle was married twice and had four children. First, in 1954 she married the artist Dietrich Sölle, with whom she had three children before divorcing in 1964. The historian Thomas Nipperdey was her brother.

Sölle died of a heart attack at a conference in Göppingen on 27 April 2003. She was buried on the Friedhof Nienstedten in Hamburg.

Sölle's theological thinking

"I believe in God/ who created the world not ready made/ like a thing that must forever stay what it is/ who does not govern according to eternal laws/ that have perpetual validity/ nor according to natural orders/ of poor and rich,/ experts and ignoramuses,/ people who dominate and people subjected./ I believe in God/ who desires the counter-argument of the living/ and the alteration of every condition/ through our work/ through our politics." (ET, from Meditationen & Gebrauchstexte. Gedichte. Berlin 1969)

The idea of a God who was "in heaven in all its glory" while Auschwitz was organized was "unbearable" for Sölle. God has to be protected against such simplifications. For some people Sölle was a kind of prophet of Christianity, who abolished the separation of theological science and practice of life, while for others she was a heretic, whose theories couldn't be united with the traditional understanding of God, and her ideas were therefore rejected as a theological cynicism.

Some of Sölle's provocative statements:
 "Vietnam is Golgotha."
 "The Third World is a permanent Auschwitz."
 "Every theological statement must be a political statement as well." (Against the Wind: Memoir of a Radical Christian (1999))
 "God has no hands except from our hands." (famous statement attributed to Teresa of Ávila which Sölle frequently used)
 "We should eat more at the Eucharist and we should pray more when eating."

Publications
 
 
 
 
 
 
 
 
 
 
 
 
 
 
 
 
 
 
 

For publications in German language see :de:Dorothee Sölle#Literatur

Texts in music 
 The musician Sergio Pinto converted Sölle's poems Credo für die Erde and Ich dein Baum, into musical compositions which were published by Verlag in 2008 under the title entwurf. The CD recording was performed by the band Grupo Sal.
 The composer Ludger Stühlmeyer converted Sölle's poems Kreuzigen and Atem Gottes hauch mich an into musical compositions as well. The vocal and organ arrangements were commissioned by a circle of friends of the Evangelische Akademie Tutzing; the work was first performed in April 2013 and included a reading by Ursula Baltz-Otto during a commemoration of the 10th anniversary of the death of Dorothee Sölle.

See also
 Johann Baptist Metz

Notes

References

Footnotes

Bibliography

Further reading

 
Stößinger, Edwin : Dorothee Sölle – eine intellektuelle Biographie (= Studien zur Kirchengeschichte. 35). Dr. Kovac, Hamburg 2022, ISBN 978-3-339-12756-3.

1929 births
2003 deaths
20th-century German Protestant theologians
Women Christian theologians
Christian feminist theologians
Christian socialist theologians
German Christian pacifists
German Christian socialists
German feminists
German Lutheran theologians
German tax resisters
Liberation theologians
Proponents of Christian feminism
Lutheran pacifists
Lutheran socialists
Political theologians
Socialist feminists
Union Theological Seminary (New York City) faculty
University of Cologne alumni
Female Christian socialists